James Campbell Clouston (31 August 1900 – 3 June 1940) was a Canadian officer in the British Royal Navy, who acted as pier-master during the Dunkirk evacuation. While returning to Dunkirk, he died in the water after his motor launch was sunk by enemy aircraft.

Biography
Clouston was born in Montreal, Quebec, Canada, the son of William Stewart Clouston and Evelyn Campbell. Edward Clouston, a prominent banker, was his uncle. He studied at Selwyn House School, Lower Canada College and McGill University. After training at the Royal Naval College, Dartmouth, he was commissioned as a sub-lieutenant on 15 August 1923, with seniority from 15 May 1921. He first served aboard the destroyer leader  in the Mediterranean, receiving promotion to lieutenant on 11 March 1924, with seniority from 15 June 1922. Promoted to commander on 31 December 1934, Clouston served as a gunnery instructor at Excellent throughout the mid-1930s before being appointed to command the destroyer  on 29 May 1937.

Dunkirk
In May 1940 while Isis was in dock for repairs, Clouston was attached the Naval Shore Party of eight officers and 160 men under the command of Captain William Tennant sent to the port of Dunkirk to help organise the evacuation. The Naval Shore Party embarked on the destroyer  at Dover and sailed on 27 May. Three officers cut cards for their assignments. Clouston won the eastern mole, a narrow wooden walkway mounted on a concrete breakwater, not designed to be used by ships, but the only part of the port that had not been heavily bombed by the Luftwaffe. For the next five days, Clouston organised and regulated the flow of men along the mole into the waiting ships.

On 1 June, Clouston returned to Dover to report to Vice-Admiral Bertram Ramsay. On the afternoon of 2 June, he and a party of 30 men left Dover on two Royal Air Force rescue motorboats for the final night of the evacuation. Off the coast of France, the two boats were strafed and bombed by eight Ju 87 Stukas, and Clouston's boat was sunk, leaving the crew clinging to the wreckage. Clouston ordered the other boat to continue to Dunkirk, and while waiting for rescue he and his men eventually succumbed to exhaustion and hypothermia. Only one man survived. On 11 July 1940, Clouston posthumously received a Mention in Despatches for his part in the Dunkirk operation. Clouston is buried in Becklingen War Cemetery, Lower Saxony, Germany.

Clouston is mentioned by Charles Gray in the 1958 film Dunkirk. Clouston was portrayed by the actor William Hope in the 2004 BBC series Dunkirk. Clouston's actions inspired the character of "Commander Bolton" in Christopher Nolan's 2017 film, Dunkirk. Due to the attention drawn to Clouston by the film, Parks Canada installed a plaque in Montreal honouring him for his role in the evacuation at Dunkirk.

Personal life
Clouston married Gwyneth Lilian Vanderpump (1906–2002) on 28 September 1935; they had two sons.

His two younger brothers were also naval officers. Lieutenant John Douglas Clouston (1909–1942) served in the Royal Canadian Naval Volunteer Reserve aboard  in the North Atlantic, and was killed in action.

References

External links
 
 

1900 births
1940 deaths
Royal Navy officers of World War II
Canadian people of Scottish descent
Royal Navy personnel killed in World War II
Military personnel from Montreal
Anglophone Quebec people
McGill University alumni
Dunkirk evacuation
Burials at Becklingen War Cemetery
Graduates of Britannia Royal Naval College